Abraham (Avi) Strauch is a former Israeli weightlifter who won five Paralympic medals and set several world records.

Career 

Since 1975 and for more than a decade, he was world champion in light-heavyweight up to 85 kg.

At the 1976 Summer Paralympics, he competed in the light-heavyweight classification and won the gold medal, pushing 207.5 kg and setting a new world record in his category.

At the 1980 Summer Paralympics, he won his second gold medal, pushing 230 kg and setting a new world record and paralympic record.

At the 1984 Summer Paralympics, he won his third gold medal, pushing 217 kg.

At the 1988 Summer Paralympics, he won his fourth gold medal, pushing 200 kg on his first attempt, while injuring his shoulder.

At the 1992 Summer Paralympics, he won his final paralympic medal, achieving a silver medal.

Strauch was active in the Israel Sports Center for the Disabled. He lived in kibbutz Ga'ash and married in 1985.

References

External links
 

Living people
Paralympic weightlifters of Israel
Weightlifters at the 1976 Summer Paralympics
Weightlifters at the 1980 Summer Paralympics
Weightlifters at the 1984 Summer Paralympics
Weightlifters at the 1988 Summer Paralympics
Weightlifters at the 1992 Summer Paralympics
Medalists at the 1976 Summer Paralympics
Medalists at the 1980 Summer Paralympics
Medalists at the 1984 Summer Paralympics
Medalists at the 1988 Summer Paralympics
Medalists at the 1992 Summer Paralympics
Paralympic gold medalists for Israel
Paralympic silver medalists for Israel
World record holders in weightlifting